Tomasz Foszmańczyk (born 7 January 1986) is a Polish professional footballer who plays as a midfielder for Polish I liga side Ruch Chorzów.

References

External links

1986 births
Living people
Sportspeople from Bytom
Polish footballers
Association football midfielders
Ruch Chorzów players
Polonia Bytom players
GKS Jastrzębie players
Raków Częstochowa players
Ruch Radzionków players
Warta Poznań players
Jagiellonia Białystok players
Korona Kielce players
Bruk-Bet Termalica Nieciecza players
GKS Katowice players
Chojniczanka Chojnice players
Ekstraklasa players
I liga players
II liga players
III liga players